General Henry Seymour Rawlinson, 1st Baron Rawlinson,  (20 February 1864 – 28 March 1925), known as Sir Henry Rawlinson, 2nd Baronet between 1895 and 1919, was a senior British Army officer in the First World War who commanded the Fourth Army of the British Expeditionary Force at the battles of the Somme (1916) and Amiens (1918) as well as the breaking of the Hindenburg Line (1918). He commanded the Indian Army from 1920 to 1925.

Early life
Rawlinson was born at Trent Manor in Dorset on 20 February 1864. His father, Sir Henry Rawlinson, 1st Baronet, was an Army officer, and a renowned Middle East scholar who is generally recognised as the father of Assyriology. He received his early formal education at Eton College.

Early military career
After passing through commissioned officer training at the Royal Military College, Sandhurst, Rawlinson entered the British Army as a lieutenant in the King's Royal Rifle Corps in India on 6 February 1884. His father arranged for him to serve on the staff of a friend, General Sir Frederick Roberts, the commander-in-chief in India. Rawlinson and the Roberts family remained close friends throughout his life.  When Roberts died in November, 1914, Rawlinson wrote, "I feel as if I have lost my second father." His first military experience was serving in Burma during the 1886 uprising.

In 1889, Rawlinson's mother died and he returned to Britain. He transferred to the Coldstream Guards, and was promoted to captain on 4 November 1891. He served on General Herbert Kitchener's staff during the advance on Omdurman in Sudan in 1898, and was promoted to major on 25 January 1899 and to brevet lieutenant-colonel on 26 January 1899.

Rawlinson served with distinction in a field command in the Second Boer War from 1899 to 1902, earning promotion to the local rank of colonel on 6 May 1901. He was in Western Transvaal during early 1902, and led a column taking part in the Battle of Rooiwal, the last battle of the war (11 April 1902). Following the end of hostilities in June 1902, he returned to the United Kingdom together with Lord Kitchener on board the SS Orotava, which arrived in Southampton on 12 July. In a despatch dated 23 June 1902, Lord Kitchener wrote of Rawlinson that he "possesses the qualities of Staff Officer and Column Commander in the field. His characteristics will always ensure him a front place in whatever he sets his mind to." For his service in the war, Rawlinson was appointed a Companion of the Order of the Bath in the April 1901 South Africa Honours list (the award was dated to 29 November 1900), and he received the actual decoration after his return home, from Edward VII at Buckingham Palace on 24 October 1902.

Rawlinson had received the brevet rank of colonel in the South Africa Honours list published on 26 June 1902, was promoted to the substantive rank of colonel on 1 April 1903, and named as commandant of the Army Staff College.

Rawlinson was the first of three reforming Commandants who transformed the Staff College into a real war school. The curriculum was modernised and updated, the teaching given a new sense of purpose and instructors became 'Directing Staff' rather than 'Professors', emphasising practicality. Major Godwin-Austen, historian of the college, wrote: "Blessed with an extremely attractive personality, a handsome appearance, high social standing, and more than an average share of this world's goods, he was one to inspire his students unconsciously to follow in his footsteps." Promoted to temporary brigadier-general on 1 March 1907, he was made Commander of 2nd Infantry Brigade at Aldershot that year and, having been promoted to major-general on 10 May 1909, he became General Officer Commanding 3rd Division in 1910. In manoeuvres in June 1912, he showed an appreciation of the use of artillery, the Times's correspondent noting approvingly, "An operation of altogether unusual character took place yesterday on Salisbury Plain when Major-General Sir Henry Rawlinson's 3rd Division practised combined field firing on a scale, which, so far as the writer can recall, has never been attempted before." The historians Robin Prior and Trevor Wilson praise Rawlinson's foresight in considering combining infantry with the fire-power of machine-guns and artillery. After handing over the division to his successor in May 1914 Rawlinson went on leave, returning on the outbreak of war to briefly serve as Director of Recruiting at the War Office.

First World War
In September 1914 Rawlinson was appointed General Officer Commanding 4th Division in France. Promoted to temporary lieutenant-general on 4 October 1914, he then took command of the IV Corps. In late September, the Belgian government formally requested British military assistance in defending Antwerp. IV Corps, acting under orders from the Cabinet, was chosen to reinforce the city. Rawlinson arrived in Antwerp on 6 October. It was soon obvious that the combined British, Belgian, and French forces were too weak to hold the city, and Kitchener decided on an evacuation two days later. IV Corps and the remnants of the Belgian Army successfully re-joined Allied forces in Western Belgium, with the Cabinet returning Rawlinson's Corps to Sir John French's command. IV Corps marched into Ypres on the night of 13–14 October, where the BEF, advancing northwards, was preparing to meet the German Army. Located at the centre of the British line, IV Corps met the main thrust of the German attacks between 18 and 27 October and suffered heavy casualties. On 28 October, IV Corps was put under the temporary command of Douglas Haig while Rawlinson went to England to oversee the preparation of 8th Division. When he returned in November the German attacks on Ypres had died down.

Rawlinson wrote to the Conservative politician Lord Derby (24 December 1914) forecasting that the Allies would win a war of attrition but it was unclear whether this would take one, two or three years. In 1915, IV Corps formed part of the First Army (General Douglas Haig). At the battle of Neuve Chapelle (10–12 March 1915), he massed 340 guns. The arrival of German reinforcements prevented further advance. Rawlinson concluded that an enemy's line of trenches could be broken 'with suitable artillery preparation' combined with secrecy. He also drew a lesson, that trench warfare called for limited advances: 'What I want to do now is what I call "Bite & Hold" – bite off a piece of the enemy's line like Neuve Chapelle & hold it against all counter-attacks...there ought to be no difficulty in holding against the enemy's counterattacks & inflicting on him at least twice the loss that we have suffered in making the bite'.

At the end of 1915, Rawlinson was considered for command of the First Army, in succession to Haig but the command was instead given to Sir Charles Monro. He was promoted to temporary general on 22 December 1915. Promoted to the substantive rank of lieutenant-general on 1 January 1916, Rawlinson assumed command of the new Fourth Army on 24 January 1916. The Fourth Army would play a major role in the planned Allied offensive on the Somme. He wrote in his diary: "It is not the lot of many men to command an army of over half a million men". The Somme was originally conceived as a joint Anglo-French offensive but owing to the demands of the Battle of Verdun, French participation was greatly reduced, leaving the British, and especially Rawlinson's inexperienced army, to bear the brunt of the offensive. On the eve of the offensive, he "showed an attitude of absolute confidence". To his diary he confided some uncertainties: "What the actual results will be no one can say but I feel pretty confident of success myself though only after heavy fighting. That the bosh [sic] will break and that a debacle will supervene I do not believe..." He was not satisfied that the wire was well cut and enemy trenches sufficiently "knocked about".

Battle of the Somme

The Somme offensive was launched on 1 July 1916. In English writing, attention has been paid to the first day, a British disaster for three of the five attacking corps, although the battle lasted 141 days against two German armies. On 1 July, British forces were repulsed by the Germans along most of the front north of the Albert–Bapaume road, suffering 57,000 casualties. The worst defeats were in front of Pozières and Thiepval. By the afternoon Rawlinson was aware of much of the disaster but not of the casualties. By 3 July he knew 8,000 prisoners had been taken. On the Allied right, the British and French had more success. Here they had a better fire plan but limited objectives as a flank guard to a main advance further north.  This was more in keeping with Rawlinson's idea of "bite and hold". There is no documentary evidence that the corps commander on the right (southern) British flank, General Walter Congreve, telephoned Rawlinson to ask permission to advance beyond his set objectives or to send in cavalry.

The principal causes of the defeat in the north were the skill of German defenders, the siting of their defences and the failure of the long and heavy preliminary artillery bombardment to destroy the German barbed wire and trenches, except in the southern sector where French heavy artillery assisted. It is not true that heavily laden British infantry were required to advance at a slow walk. The researches of the historians Robin Prior and Trevor Wilson have shown that the majority of battalions were out in No Man's Land before whistles blew. This was of no avail, except in the south, against skilful placing of German machine guns in enfilade positions and German artillery fire falling on British trenches to prevent reinforcements reaching the 36th (Ulster) Division, who had penetrated the German position north of Thiepval. Rawlinson's 'Tactical Notes', initially drafted by his chief of staff Archie Montgomery, were not prescriptive, giving initiative to battalion commanders to choose their formations.

Haig told Rawlinson to exploit success in the south. Fourth Army fought its way forward towards the second German line atop the Bazentin Ridge. At first light on 14 July, following a night approach march, a two-day preparatory bombardment of over 375,000 shells and a five-minute intensive hurricane bombardment, the leading British attackers, some within  of enemy lines attacked the German position. Nearly all first line objectives were taken. The Germans suffered 2,200 casualties and the British took 1,400 prisoners. The British were unable to exploit this success and a long period of difficult fighting followed. The Germans made excellent use of the woods on the battlefield, turning each into a strongpoint. Rawlinson mainly failed to intervene and coordinate attacks until late August and early September, when he massed guns and men, enabling brigades of the 16th (Irish) Division to capture Guillemont village. By late September, superior British artillery and better tactics enabled the British to achieve a striking success in the Battle of Morval.  At the start of October, the rain and the temperature fell and the battlefield turned into a quagmire. The only late success was gained by the Fifth Army (formerly Reserve Army, Hubert Gough) capturing Beaumont Hamel.

The results of the Somme remain in dispute; casualties on both sides were immense. There is evidence that the German Army suffered enormous damage from an increasingly effective British artillery aided by French and British air superiority over the battlefield. "The unprecedented English artillery fire on the Somme is filling the hospitals more than ever" wrote the wife of a German aristocrat. Rawlinson contributed to this in his awareness of guns and aircraft and his planning aided by his chief of staff for attacks on 14 July and 25 September. On and before 1 July and during most of August he has been criticised for giving insufficient direction and did not consistently assert control over subordinate commanders. There was cautious British optimism at the end of the Battle and General Sir Henry Wilson's felt that Haig could defeat Germany in 1917 by fighting "two Sommes at once", but that he should be told how much manpower was available and told to plan accordingly.

In January 1917, Rawlinson was promoted to permanent general "for distinguished service in the field". For a period in 1917–18, he also commanded the Second Army. In February 1918 he was appointed British Permanent Military Representative to the inter-Allied Supreme War Council at Versailles.

Battles of 1918

On 28 March 1918, Rawlinson took over Fifth Army from Hubert Gough, sacked in the wake of the German March offensive, Operation Michael; his Fourth Army Staff joined him and Fifth Army became Fourth Army on 2 April. By this time the German Army's offensive had been checked, and the Allies were preparing a counter-offensive. Following the success of the Australian attack at Le Hamel on 4 July, Rawlinson proposed to Haig a larger attack, designed to force the Germans back from the city of Amiens and further to damage the German Army's weakening morale. At lunch on 16 July Haig agreed, saying he had already proposed such an operation. Rawlinson had learned from his experiences on the Somme. "The immeasurable superiority of the planning for 8 August 1918 over that for 1 July 1916 testified to the distance the BEF had travelled in the interim." The attack was to be on a relatively narrow front, with no prior bombardment and limited objectives. To ensure a breakthrough, Haig gave Rawlinson command of virtually the whole British armoured forces. By this stage of the war British manpower was severely depleted, and to achieve the breakthrough, the 4th Army comprised four Canadian, five Australian, five British and one American division.

The Allies achieved surprise and the Battle of Amiens proved a striking success. On 8 August, described by General Erich Ludendorff as "the black day of the German Army", the Allies took 12,000 prisoners and captured 450 guns. The German and Allied commands were struck by the collapse in German morale and the high number of Germans surrendering without a fight. The Allies were still cautious about pressing their advantage too far and on 11 August Rawlinson advised Haig to halt the offensive. In September, again commanding a mixed force of British, Australian and American divisions, Rawlinson participated in the breaking of the Hindenburg Line, a major part of the Hundred Days Offensive. Initial planning was by John Monash, the Australian commander, but Rawlinson broadened the front and gave him more tanks. The Allied attack was preceded by a massive artillery bombardment. The Fourth Army's advance continued in the Battles of the Selle and the Sambre and Oise Canal. In the Hundred Days, the Fourth Army had gained , taking 80,000 prisoners and 1,100 guns.

Later life and Indian Command
Rawlinson was bestowed with many honours in reward for his role in the First World War. He was made a Knight Grand Cross of the Royal Victorian Order in 1917 and appointed a Knight Commander of the Order of St Michael and St George 1918. In August 1919 the Houses of Parliament passed a vote of thanks to him for his military service, and awarded him the sum of £30,000 from the Exchequer. In 1919, he was raised to the peerage as Baron Rawlinson of Trent in the County of Dorset, and appointed a Knight Grand Cross of the Order of the Bath.

Rawlinson was again called on to organise an evacuation, this time of the Allied forces that had been sent to Russia to intervene in the Russian Civil War. In November 1919 he became General Officer Commanding-in-Chief for Aldershot Command.

In 1920, Rawlinson was made Commander-in-Chief, India. Winston Churchill as Secretary of State for War was instrumental in securing his appointment, over-riding a tradition that the post alternated between officers from the British and Indian Armies. He told Lloyd George that the post should go to the best qualified officer and that his military advisors "entirely supported my view that the best appointment we could make would be that of General Lord Rawlinson". He held the post until his death. He faced severe challenges. Brigadier Reginald Dyer's ordering his men to shoot at a crowd at Amritsar, killing 387 unarmed Indians, left a deep legacy of bitterness. The 3rd Afghan War had ended, but there was continued fighting in Waziristan. A hugely expanded army faced postwar demobilisation and continued cost of modernisation. The new commander-in-chief was expected to introduce a measure of "Indianisation", giving commissions to Indians. Under the system of Dyarchy, Indians, generally opposed to military expenditure, took a share in government and Rawlinson would have to justify army budgets.  The Moplah Rebellion of 1921 brought widespread disorder. When Gandhi launched the movement of non-cooperation with the British on 1 August 1920, he wished to avoid popular violence, but in 1922 the campaign degenerated: a crowd attacked a police station at Chauri Chaura, set fire to the building and 22 or 23 policemen were burnt to death or hacked down by the crowd. Gandhi cancelled the campaign, but he and other leaders of the resistance were arrested. Rawlinson certainly began his command believing that the Army would have to maintain order. On 15 July, he complained that:

John Newsinger argues that "there is no doubt that the great majority of the British in India, soldiers, officials, civilians, agreed with Rawlinson on this. A few months later he noted in his journal that he "was determined to fight for the white community against any black sedition or rebellion", and, if necessary, "be the next Dyer". Nonetheless, with Gandhi temporarily behind bars and increasing economic stability as the 1920s advanced, Rawlinson had the scope to reduce the Army's strength, modernise its equipment and work closely with Viceroys Chelmsford and Reading to try to make dyarchy a success. In Waziristan, the British and Indian Field Force backed by aircraft put an end to the fighting, built roads and established a brigade base at Razmak. Rawlinson announced a scheme of "Indianisation" to the Legislative Assembly on 17 February 1923. Its aim, he said, was to "give Indians a fair opportunity of providing that units officered by Indians will be efficient in every way". The Prince of Wales' Royal Indian Military College was founded at Dehra Dun in 1922, run on English public school lines, to encourage potential officer candidates.

In 1924, Rawlinson was appointed a Knight Grand Commander of the Order of the Star of India. By the end of his Indian command, he had reduced the Indian army in numbers and cost, but improved firepower, mobility and training. In financial matters he had been hugely helped by Sir Bhupendra Mitra, who had financial details "at his finger's ends". He had been appointed to succeed Lord Cavan as CIGS when he left India.

Death
Rawlinson died on 28 March 1925 at the age of 61 at Delhi in India, after a medical operation for a stomach ailment, although not long before the operation he had played polo and cricket and seemed fit and well. His body was carried back to England on the SS Assaye, which was met on reaching the English Channel by a Royal Navy destroyer, onto which the coffin was transferred, then carried into Portsmouth Harbour, being met at the South Jetty by a military ceremonial receiving party. Rawlinson was buried in the chapel of St Michael and St George in the north transept of St Andrew's Church, Trent, in the county of Dorset.

Personal life
Rawlinson was a gifted water colour artist. In March 1920, he and Winston Churchill enjoyed a painting holiday together on the French estate of the Duke of Westminster. "The General paints in water colours and does it very well," wrote Churchill. "With all my enormous paraphernalia, I have produced very indifferent results here." He married Meredith Sophia Francis Kennard (1861–1931) at St Paul's Church, Knightsbridge, London on 5 November 1890, the marriage producing no children. On Henry Rawlinson's death the baronetcy passed to his brother Alfred Rawlinson.

Honours

British
 Knight Grand Cross of the Royal Victorian Order (GCVO) - 14 July 1917 (KCVO: 15 August 1916; CVO: 30 June 1905)
 Knight Commander of the Order of St. Michael and St. George (KCMG) – 1 January 1918
 Knight Grand Cross of the Order of the Bath (GCB) – 1 January 1919 (KCB: 18 February 1915; CB: 1902)
 Baron Rawlinson, of Trent in the County of Dorset – 31 October 1919

Other
 Grand Officer of the Legion of Honour of France – 24 February 1916
 Order of Danilo, 1st Class of the Kingdom of Montenegro – 31 October 1916
 Obilitch Medal in Gold of the Kingdom of Montenegro – 21 April 1917
 Order of St. George, 4th Class of the Empire of Russia – 1 June 1917
 Grand Officer of the Order of Leopold of Belgium – 26 July 1917
 Croix de Guerre of Belgium – 11 March 1918
 Croix de Guerre of France  – 11 March 1919
 Army Distinguished Service Medal of the United States – 12 July 1919

References

Further reading
 Atwood, Rodney, (2018) 'General Lord Rawlinson. From Tragedy to Triumph'. Bloomsbury Academic, 

 Jacobsen, Mark, (2002) 'Rawlinson in India'. Publications of the Army Records Society Vol 19.Sutton Publishing, Stroud, Glos.
 
 Maurice, Major-General Sir Frederick (1928), The Life of General Lord Rawlinson of Trent G.C.B., G.C.V.O., G.C.S.I., K.C.M.G.: From His Journals and Letters Cassell, OCLC 924000844
 Prior, Robin (2004) Command on the Western Front: The Military Career of Sir Henry Rawlinson 1914–1918 Leo Cooper, 
 
 Rawlinson, A. (1923) Adventures in the Near East, 1918–1922 Andrew Melrose, OCLC 369625881

External links 

 National Portrait Gallery (13 portraits, 6 displayed)
 
The Papers of General Lord (Henry S) Rawlinson held at Churchill Archives Centre

|-

|-

|-

|-

1864 births
1925 deaths
Allied intervention in the Russian Civil War
People educated at Eton College
People from Westminster
Barons in the Peerage of the United Kingdom
British Army personnel of the Mahdist War
British Army personnel of the Second Boer War
British Army generals of World War I
British Commanders-in-Chief of India
English polo players
British Army generals
Graduates of the Royal Military College, Sandhurst
Knights Grand Cross of the Order of the Bath
Knights Grand Commander of the Order of the Star of India
Knights Grand Cross of the Royal Victorian Order
Knights Commander of the Order of St Michael and St George
Knights of the Order of St John
King's Royal Rifle Corps officers
Graduates of the Staff College, Camberley
Commandants of the Staff College, Camberley
Barons created by George V
Military personnel from Dorset
Burials in Dorset
Members of the Council of the Governor General of India